K. australis  may refer to:
 Kingia australis, a plant species
 Kritosaurus australis, an hadrosaurid (duckbilled) dinosaur species that lived about 73 million years ago, in the Late Cretaceous of South America

See also
 Australis (disambiguation)